The Motor Car Act 1903 (3 Edw. 7. c. 36) was an Act of the United Kingdom Parliament that received royal assent on 14 August 1903, which introduced motor vehicle registration, driver licensing and increased the speed limit.

Context
The Act followed the Locomotives on Highways Act 1896 which had increased the speed limit for motorcars to 14 mph from the previous 4 mph in rural area and 2 mph in towns. 

There were some who wished to see the speed limit removed altogether. The influential Automobile Club (soon to become the Royal Automobile Club or RAC) was split on the subject; the chair of the working group on the Bill was John Douglas-Scott-Montagu MP who took a moderate line supporting speed limits, but was opposed on this by the chairman of the organisation Roger Wallace who were 'strongly against any speed limit' and described Montagu as a 'traitor'. The secretary of the club publicly proposed a 'compromise' of 25 mph without authorisation. Parliamentary debates were described as 'bitter'.

Sections of the Act 
 Section 1 introduced the crime of reckless driving, and imposed penalties.
 Section 2 introduced the mandatory vehicle registration of all motor cars with the county council or county borough council in which the driver was resident. The council was to issue a unique number to each car, and prescribe the manner in which it was to be displayed on the vehicle. The Act also made it an offence to drive a motor car on a public road without displaying its registration number.
 Section 3 made it compulsory for drivers of motor cars  in the United Kingdom to have a driving licence from "the first day of January, nineteen hundred and four". No test was required, the licence being issued by the council on payment of five shillings. The qualifying age for a car licence was 17 years and for a motor cycle, 14 years.
 The speed limit on public highway was raised to 20 mph from 14 mph which had been set by the Locomotives on Highways Act 1896.
 Section 9 allowed for lower speed limits to be implemented after a local inquiry.
 Regulations were introduced regarding the braking ability of vehicles.

Legacy
The Act was intended to last for only three years but was extended by the Expiring Laws Continuance Act 1900 until a new bill was seriously discussed in 1929 and enacted. Both the Locomotives on Highways Act 1896 and the Motor Car Act 1903 were repealed by the Road Traffic Act 1930. 

A Royal Commission on Motorcars was established in 1905 which reported in 1907 and recommended that motorcars should be taxed, that the speed limit should be abolished (by a majority vote only) and raised concern about the manner in which speed traps were being used to raise revenue in rural areas rather than being used to protect lives in towns. Amendments were discussed in 1905, 1911, 1913 1914 under the titles Motor Car Act (1903) Amendment bill and Motor Car Act (1903) Amendment (No 2) bill.

See also
Locomotives on Highways Act 1896
Roads Act 1920
Road Traffic Act 1930
Road Traffic Act 1934
Road speed limits in the United Kingdom
 Rolls-Royce Legalimit

References

Further reading
Debate on the speed of motorcars in the House of Commons of the United Kingdom June 1903
Debate on the Motor-Cars Bill in the House of Lords August 1903

1903 in law
United Kingdom Acts of Parliament 1903
1903 in transport
Transport policy in the United Kingdom
Driving in the United Kingdom
Transport legislation
History of transport in the United Kingdom